Mary Uduma (born on May 25, 1952) is a Nigerian business executive. She is a two times President of Nigeria Internet Registration Association (NIRA). She is the chairperson of Nigeria Internet Governance Forum.

Education 
Uduma studied accounting at Institute of Management Technology, Enugu (IMT). She later attended University of Lagos and obtained her  B.Sc in accounting.

Career 
Uduma worked at Federal Audit as an executive officer when she was still schooling at University of Lagos. She later worked with Ivory Merchant Bank.

In 1995, Uduma joined Nigerian Communications Commission as the finance assistant director. In 1999 she became the deputy director in tariff and charges department. She was move to corporate planning in 2005 where she worked for one year before becoming the Director of Licensing. She became the head of consumer affairs in 2011.

She served as the vice president of Nigeria Internet Registration Association (NIRA) before emerging as the 2nd President of the association. She was also re-elected as the 3rd President.  She is the chairperson for Nigeria Internet Governance Forum (NIGF). She represented NIGF at the 2019 International Women Day program held Abuja and spoke on the inclusion of women having a say in policies involving cyber space both locally and internationally.

Award 
In 2016, she received special recognition award from the NIRA Presidential Award, by the Nigeria Internet Registration Association (NIRA).

References 

Living people
1952 births
University of Lagos alumni
Nigerian business executives